The Darlington Schoolhouse is located in the Darlington section of Mahwah, Bergen County, New Jersey, United States. The schoolhouse was built in 1891 and added to the National Register of Historic Places on March 14, 2008. The first floor of the schoolhouse consists of a large room in which grades one through eight were taught. The second floor served as a community hall, and as a chapel used by members of the Dutch Reformed Church at Romopock. The schoolhouse has been restored by the New York–New Jersey Trail Conference, for use as its permanent headquarters.

See also
National Register of Historic Places listings in Bergen County, New Jersey
List of museums in New Jersey
New York-New Jersey Trail Conference

External links
 Historic Darlington Schoolhouse is new headquarters - New York – New Jersey Trail Conference
 Google Street View of Darlington Schoolhouse

References

Shingle Style architecture in New Jersey
School buildings completed in 1891
Buildings and structures in Bergen County, New Jersey
Defunct schools in New Jersey
Former school buildings in the United States
Mahwah, New Jersey
School buildings on the National Register of Historic Places in New Jersey
National Register of Historic Places in Bergen County, New Jersey
New Jersey Register of Historic Places